Gergentala is a rural locality (a selo) in Manasaulsky Selsoviet, Buynaksky District, Republic of Dagestan, Russia. The population was 27 as of 2010.

Geography 
Gergentala is located 14 km southwest of Buynaksk (the district's administrative centre) by road. Manasaul is the nearest rural locality.

References 

Rural localities in Buynaksky District